Anaretella is a genus of midges in the family Cecidomyiidae. There are seven described species. The genus was established by German scientist Günther Enderlein in 1911 and has a cosmopolitan distribution.

Species
Anaretella acutissima Mamaev, 1998
Anaretella ampliata (Plakidas, 2017)
Anaretella defecta (Winnertz, 1870)
Anaretella glacialis Mamaev & Økland, 1996
Anaretella iola Pritchard, 1951
Anaretella nitida (Edwards, 1928)
Anaretella supermagna Mamaev & Økland, 1996

References

Cecidomyiidae genera

Insects described in 1911
Taxa named by Günther Enderlein